Michael Wohlfahrt (1687–1741), aka Michael Welfare, was an American religious leader who assisted Conrad Beissel in leading the Ephrata Community in Pennsylvania.

Wohlfahrt was born in Memel in the Duchy of Prussia (now Klaipėda in Lithuania), but emigrated to North America.

In 1725, he was baptised by Conrad Beissel, and when the Conestoga Brethren congregation suffered a schism, he strongly supported Beissel. After the foundation of the Ephrata Community in 1732, Wohlfahrt took the name "Brother Agonius" and assisted Beissel in running the community.

Welfare was an acquaintance of Benjamin Franklin who, in his autobiography, recounted that "the Dunkers" had been "calumniated by the zealots of other persuasions". Franklin suggested publishing articles about their beliefs, to which Welfare had responded:

 

Franklin commented on this:

In 1985 Neil Postman drew another parallel by referring to a quote by Plato:

References

External links
 Message from the MENNO-ROOTS-L archives, largely about Wohlfahrt
 "Brethern, Schwenkfelders and Other Plain People", an article which quotes some correspondence between Wohlfahrt and Benjamin Franklin
 An extended quote with commentary from the Autobiography of Benjamin Franklin

1687 births
1741 deaths
American Christian religious leaders
German emigrants to the United States
People from Ephrata, Pennsylvania
People from Klaipėda
People from the Duchy of Prussia